The Cabinet of Malaysia (Malay: Jemaah Menteri Malaysia) is the executive branch of the Government of Malaysia. Led by the Prime Minister, the cabinet is a council of ministers who are accountable collectively to the Parliament. According to the Article 43 of the Federal Constitution, members of the Cabinet can only be selected from members of either houses of Parliament. Formally, the Yang di-Pertuan Agong appoints all Ministers on the advice of the Prime Minister. The constitution is amended by repealing the Clause (8) of Article 43, enabling a person who is a member of State Legislative Assembly to continue to serve even while serving as a minister or deputy minister in the cabinet. Ministers other than the Prime Minister shall hold office during the pleasure of the Yang di-Pertuan Agong, unless the appointment of any Minister shall have been revoked by the Yang di-Pertuan Agong on the advice of the Prime Minister but any Minister may resign from office. In practice, the Yang di-Pertuan Agong is obliged to follow the advice of the Prime Minister on the appointment and dismissal of ministers.

Cabinet appointments 
Members of the Cabinet must be members of either house of Parliament. Most ministers are appointed from the lower house, the Dewan Rakyat, although a few are appointed from the upper house, the Dewan Negara. The Prime Minister must be a member of the Dewan Rakyat. Although Deputy Ministers and Parliamentary Secretaries may be appointed to each portfolio, they are not included in the Cabinet. The Cabinet meets weekly, every Wednesday. After the position of Parliamentary Secretary was removed and partial live telecasts of Parliament proceedings began in 2008, Cabinet meetings were moved to Fridays whenever Parliament sat, so as to allow Ministers to personally answer questions during Question Time in Parliament.

Cabinet composition 
The composition of the Cabinet, and the number of portfolios depends mainly on the wishes of the Prime Minister at the time. However, the post of Finance Minister was considered so important as to be a necessity, and as a result was incorporated by the Minister of Finance (Incorporation) Act 1957 (Act 375). The position of Deputy Prime Minister is one that exists by convention, and as a result a Prime Minister could theoretically form a Cabinet without a Deputy.

Deputy ministers exist for each portfolio, although they are not considered members of the Cabinet. The position of Deputy Minister was created by constitutional amendment in 1960. The office of parliamentary secretary for each ministry exists but none were appointed after the 2008 Malaysian general election. Parliamentary secretaries were provided for by an amendment in 1963. Deputy ministers and parliamentary secretaries are also appointed from members of Parliament, and deputise for the ministers in government ministries and in Parliament respectively. An additional office, that of the Political Secretary, exists. Political Secretaries need not be members of Parliament. Before taking office, all members of the Cabinet, Deputy Ministers, Parliamentary Secretaries, and Political Secretaries take an oath of secrecy concerning the proceedings of the Cabinet.

Functions of cabinet 
An outline of the functions of the Cabinet are as follows:

 To formulate national economic policies and development programmes.  
 The Cabinet is responsible to formulate various development programs and projects for the development of the country. Examples are the New Economic Policy (NEP), the National Development Policy (NDP), and the National Vision Policy (NVP).   
 To set the budget and finance of the country.
 The government is allowed to generate revenues from the people through the collection of taxes, fines, summons, custom duties, fees, etc. 
 The government is allowed to plan for the various development programs, and also to allocate the resources for these development plans and programs.   
 As an arena for suggestions, debates, and criticisms.
 The Cabinet is allowed to discuss almost any issues of national interests, except those that touch on the special rights of the Malays, Bumiputeras and/or royal privileges. Article 153 (1): It shall be the responsibility of the Yang di-Pertuan Agong to safeguard the special position of the Malays and Natives of any of the States of Sabah and Sarawak, and the legitimate interests of other communities in accordance with the provisions of this Article.
 To propose and amend the law.
 Law is proposed by the Executive and introduce in Parliament with the 1st, 2nd, and 3rd readings for approval.
 Most provisions for the amendments of the constitution requires a 2/3 majority of the total number of members from both of the Houses (Dewan Negara and Dewan Rakyat)
 The bill must be presented to the Yang di-Pertuan Agong for the final assent.

List of cabinets 
23 cabinets have taken place in Malaysia since 1957 headed by nine Prime Ministers.

Current cabinet

Inactive portfolio 
Ministry of Agriculture and Food Security
 Ministry of Agriculture
Ministry of Agriculture and Agro-based Industry
 Ministry of Agriculture and Co-operatives
 Ministry of Agriculture and Fisheries
 Ministry of Agriculture and Food Industryies
 Ministry of Agriculture and Lands
 Ministry of Agriculture and Rural Development
Ministry of Digital Communications
 Ministry of Communications
 Ministry of Communications and Multimedia
 Ministry of Communications, Telecommunications and Posts
 Ministry of Information
 Ministry of Information and Broadcasting
 Ministry of Information, Communications and Culture
 Ministry of Information, Communications, Arts and Culture
Ministry of Domestic Trade and Living Costs

 Ministry of Domestic Trade and Consumer Affairs (Malaysia)
 Ministry of Domestic Trade, Co-operatives and Consumerism

Ministry of Entrepreneur Development and Co-operatives

 Ministry of Coordination of Public Corporations
 Ministry of Public Enterprises
 Ministry of Entrepreneur Development
Ministry of Territories
 Ministry of Federal Territories
 Ministry of Federal Territories and Urban Wellbeing
Ministry of Foreign Affairs
 Ministry of External Affairs
Ministry of Finance

 Ministry of Economic Affairs
Ministry of General Planning and Sosio-Economic Research

Ministry of Home Affairs
 Ministry of Home Affairs and Justice
Ministry of Internal Security
 Ministry of Justice
Ministry of Law
 Ministry of the Interior
Ministry of Human Resources
 Ministry of Labour
 Ministry of Labour and Manpower
 Ministry of Labour and Social Welfare
Ministry of International Trade and Industry
 Ministry of Commerce and Industry
 Ministry of Trade and Industry
Ministry of Energy and Natural Resources

 Ministry of Energy, Communications and Multimedia
 Ministry of Energy, Science, Technology, Environment and Climate Change
 Ministry of Energy, Technology and Research
 Ministry of Energy, Telecommunications and Posts
 Ministry of Energy, Water and Communications
 Ministry of Environment and Water
 Ministry of Lands and Co-operatives Development
 Ministry of Lands and Mines
 Ministry of Lands Development
 Ministry of Lands and Regional Development
 Ministry of Natural Resources
Ministry of Plantation Industries and Commodities
 Ministry of Primary Industries
Ministry of Rural and Regional Development
 Ministry of National and Rural Development
 Ministry of Rural Development
 Ministry of Rural Economy Development
Ministry of Science and Technology
 Ministry of Science, Technology and Environment
 Ministry of Science, Technology and Innovation (Malaysia)
 Ministry of Technology, Research and Local Government
Ministry of Tourism
 Ministry of Arts, Culture and Heritage
 Ministry of Culture and Tourism
 Ministry of Culture, Arts and Tourism
 Ministry of National Unity and Community Development
 Ministry of National Unity, Culture, Arts and Heritage
 Ministry of Tourism, Arts and Culture
Ministry of Tourism and Culture
Ministry of Local Government Development

 Ministry of Federal Territories
 Ministry of Federal Territories and Urban Wellbeing
 Ministry of Housing and Local Government
 Ministry of Housing and New Villages
 Ministry of Housing and Villages Development
 Ministry of Local Government and Environment
 Ministry of Local Government and Federal Territories
 Ministry of Local Government, Housing and Town Planning
 Ministry of Technology, Research and Coordination of New Villages
 Ministry of Territories
Ministry of Urban Wellbeing, Housing and Local Government
Ministry of Women, Family and Community Development
 Ministry of General Welfare
 Ministry of National Unity
 Ministry of Social Welfare
 Ministry of Welfare Services
 Ministry of Women and Family Development
Ministry of Works
 Ministry of Works and Energy
 Ministry of Works and Public Amenities
 Ministry of Works and Transport
 Ministry of Works, Posts and Telecommunications
Ministry of Youth and Sports
 Ministry of Culture, Youth and Sports
 Ministry of Youth, Culture and Sports
Ministry of Health
 Ministry of Health and Social Welfare
Minister in the Prime Minister's Department
 Minister with Special Functions
 Minister with Special Functions for Foreign Affairs
 Minister without Portfolio
Others
 Chief Minister of Malaya
 Ministry of Sabah Affairs
 Ministry of Sarawak Affairs

See also
 Shadow Cabinet of Malaysia
 Prime Minister's Department (Malaysia)
 List of female cabinet ministers of Malaysia
List of federal ministries and agencies in Malaysia

References

External links 
 Malaysian Cabinet Members